The Santiago de Compostela derailment occurred on 24 July 2013, when an Alvia high-speed train traveling from Madrid to Ferrol, in the north-west of Spain, derailed at high speed on a bend about  outside of the railway station at Santiago de Compostela. Out of 222 people (218 passengers and 4 crew) on board, 143 were injured and 79 died.

The train's data recorder showed that it was traveling at over twice the posted speed limit of  when it entered a curve on the track. The crash was recorded on a track-side camera that shows all thirteen train cars derailing and four overturning. On 28 July 2013, the train's driver, Francisco José Garzón Amo, was charged with 79 counts of homicide by professional recklessness and an undetermined number of counts of causing injury by professional recklessness.

The crash was Spain's worst rail accident in over forty years, since a crash near El Cuervo, Seville, in 1972. The Torre del Bierzo crash in 1944 remains the deadliest.

Background

Spain has one of the world's most extensive high-speed railway (HSR) networks, built and maintained by the state-owned infrastructure company Adif and run by the operator Renfe, which is also a state-owned company that manages the rolling stock.

The RENFE Class 730 passenger train is in service on this line, as it can run on both conventional and high-speed tracks. The Class 730 also has two generator cars that allow its electric traction motors to function on non-electrified lines, but that bring its weight per axle well over the normal value for high velocity trains.

Derailment

At 20:41 CEST (18:41 UTC) on 24 July 2013, the passenger train, on an express route from Madrid to Ferrol, derailed on a section of conventional track at the end of the Olmedo-Zamora-Galicia line, at Angrois in Santiago de Compostela. All vehicles  the two power cars, their adjacent generator cars (both with diesel tanks) at both ends of the train and the nine intermediate carriages  derailed as the train rounded the A Grandeira curve; four cars overturned. A track-side CCTV camera video indicates that the front generator car was the first to leave the rails, followed by the leading passenger coaches, the front power car, the rear generator car and finally the rear power car. Three of the carriages were torn apart in the accident and another caught fire due to gaseous leaking diesel fuel. The rear generator car also caught fire.

The train was carrying 218 passengers at the time of the crash. Out of the 218 passengers, there were 79 fatalities (at one point reported as 80 due to a misidentification of some remains) and the remaining 139 were injured. Among the dead there were twelve foreigners: two French, two Italians, two Americans, an Algerian, a Venezuelan, a Brazilian, a Colombian, a Mexican and a Dominican. One of the victims was Spanish journalist Enrique Beotas. The train's two drivers were injured but survived.

Reaction
The regional government leader, Alberto Núñez Feijóo, remarked, "There are bodies lying on the railway track. It's a Dante-esque scene". About 320 Spanish national police were dispatched to the scene of the accident. Festivities planned for 25 July, which is a regional holiday, were cancelled.

Prime Minister Mariano Rajoy called an emergency ministerial meeting, saying, "I want to express my affection and solidarity with the victims of the terrible train accident in Santiago." On 25 July, Rajoy visited the area and declared three days of national mourning. King Juan Carlos and Queen Sofía visited injured survivors in hospital at Santiago de Compostela.

On 9 August, the Spanish government announced that there would be a nationwide review of all railway lines, their signalling and the route knowledge of train drivers.

Investigation

The Comisión de Investigación de Accidentes Ferroviarios is responsible for the investigation of railway accidents in Spain. A government spokesperson said that all signs pointed to the Santiago de Compostela derailment being an accident and said there was no evidence that terrorism was a factor. 

Eyewitnesses said the train was travelling at high speed before derailing. This was confirmed by
In court the train's driver, Garzón Amo, stated that the train was travelling at 180–190 km/h (111–118 mph) at the time of the accident.

Various media outlets reported that Garzón Amo had, over a year ago, boasted on his personal Facebook page, of the speeds at which his trains would travel. One Facebook posting, reported by Spanish media, attributed to Garzón Amo, stated: "It would be amazing to go alongside police and overtake them and trigger off the speed camera", accompanied by a photo of a train's speedometer clocking . A follow-up comment attributed to Garzón Amo reads: "Ha ha ha, that would be a lovely fine for Renfe." However, these speeds are normal and fully permitted on the high-speed line sections.

The high-speed track has ERTMS-compliant signalling, which is designed to slow or stop a train whose driver is ignoring signals or the speed limits. However, the new high-speed line joins a conventional track shared with low-speed trains, at the curve where the accident happened. The conventional track only had the older ASFA signalling system, which will warn drivers if they are exceeding speed limits, but will not automatically slow or stop a speeding train. There is a different system capable of stopping a train if it passes a red signal but that was irrelevant in this case. Part of the ongoing investigation into the incident will focus on whether any of these speed monitoring systems failed and why the originally built-in safety system ETCS/ERTMS had been disconnected. 

Garzón Amo was detained pending a criminal investigation, according to a spokeswoman for the Court of Justice of Galicia regional supreme court. Garzón told the investigating magistrate, Luis Alaez, that he suffered a "lapse of concentration" as he approached the curve when the train should have been slowed to 80 km per hour.

On 28 July 2013, Garzón Amo was charged with 79 counts of homicide by professional recklessness and an undetermined number of counts of causing injury by professional recklessness. Further charges were brought against safety director Andres Maria Cortabitarte in 2017 for "crimes of homicide and injuries through serious negligence".

Court investigators said that the driver was speaking on the telephone to staff at Renfe about the route to Ferrol, and consulting a map or document, shortly before the brakes were activated and that he did apply the brakes, but not in time to achieve the safe speed limit for the curve.

Corrective actions
In the immediate aftermath of the accident, the Spanish rail authority Adif installed three ASFA ("Automatic Braking and Announcement of Signals" in English) balises on 1.9 km of the approach to Santiago de Compostela to enforce speed limits of 160, 60 and 30 km/h, to prevent trains from reaching a speed that would cause a similar derailment.

See also

 Salisbury rail crash (1906), a LSWR boat train from Plymouth's Friary railway station to London Waterloo station failed to navigate a very sharp curve at the eastern end of Salisbury railway station.
 Amagasaki rail crash (2005), a suburban train crash that occurred on a curve at high speed.
 Eckwersheim derailment (2015), a similar incident in France that occurred when a high-speed train entered a curve at excessive speed during commissioning tests of a new high-speed line
 Valencia Metro derailment (2006)
 List of rail accidents (2010–2019)
 List of rail accidents in Spain

Notes
  The 2004 Madrid train bombings, which killed 191 people, were an act of terrorism, not an accident.

References

External links

 Spanish Government's Ministry of Public Works Commission for Railways Accidents Investigation – accident final dossier (Archive) 

2013 in Galicia (Spain)
2010s disasters in Spain
Derailments in Spain
July 2013 crimes in Europe
Railway accidents in 2013
Derailment